The Tripartite Treaty may refer to:

 The Hewett Treaty between Ethiopia, Egypt, and the United Kingdom concerning ownership of Eritrea and the evacuation of Egyptian troops from Mahdist Sudan
 The Tripartite Treaty (1906) between France, Italy, and the United Kingdom concerning Ethiopian sovereignty and railroad construction
 The Tripartite Agreement of 1915 between China, Russia and Mongolia wherein the latter was recognised as an autonomous part of China
 The Tripartite Pact between Germany, Italy, and Japan, establishing the Axis alliance

hands of Ethiopia...no more